Sila or Dar Sila is a region of Chad, located in the south-east of the country. It was created in 2008 from the departments of Sila and Djourf Al Ahmar which were previously part of Ouaddaï Region. The capital of the region is Goz Beïda.

Geography 
The region borders Ouaddaï Region to the north, Sudan to the east, the Central African Republic to the south-east, Salamat Region to the south-west, and Guéra Region to the west. The terrain is generally flat savannah, with some scattered hills.

Settlements 
Goz Beïda is the capital of the region; other major settlements include Adé, Am Dam, Haouich, Kerfi, Koukou Angarana, Magrane, Mogororo, Moudeïna and Tissi.

Demographics 
As per the 2009 Chadian census, Sila has a population of 387,461. The main ethnolinguistic groups are the Birgit, Dar Sila Daju, Fongoro, Fur, Kajakse, Karanga, Kibet, Kujarge, Runga and Sinyar.

Subdivisions 
Sila is divided into two departments:

See also
 Dar Sila

References 

 
States and territories established in 2008
Regions of Chad